Formal electricity services are solely provided by the state-owned Liberia Electricity Corporation, which operates a small grid almost exclusively in the Greater Monrovia District. The vast majority of electric energy services is provided by small privately owned generators. At $0.54 per kWh, the electricity tariff in Liberia is among the highest in the world. Total installed capacity in 2013 was 20 MW, a sharp decline from a peak of 191 MW in 1989.

Electricity access in Liberia’s urban areas is 34% and in rural areas it is almost 0%. Around 21% of total electricity production came from renewable energy sources in 2010. Liberia has the potential to further develop its wind, solar, and hydroelectric energy resources. The country aims to generate 75% of its electricity from renewable sources by 2030.

Completion of the repair and expansion of the Mount Coffee Hydropower Plant, with a maximum capacity of 80 MW, is scheduled to be completed by 2018, while construction of three new heavy fuel oil power plants is expected to boost electrical capacity by 38 MW. In 2013, Liberia began importing power from neighboring Côte d'Ivoire and Guinea through the West African Power Pool.

See also 
 List of power stations in Liberia

References 

 
Energy in Africa